Hans Jákupsson Debes (1723–1769) was Lawman of the Faroe Islands from 1752 to 1769.

Hans Jákupsson came from Oyri and was married to the daughter of lawman Sámal Pætursson Lamhauge, from whom he took over as lawman.

References

Løgtingið 150 - Hátíðarrit. Tórshavn 2002, Bind 2, S. 366. (Avsnitt Føroya løgmenn fram til 1816) (PDF-Download )

1723 births
1769 deaths
Lawmen of the Faroe Islands